Azurduy Municipality (Municipio de Azurduy, Villa Azurduy Municipality) is the first municipal section of Azurduy Province in the Chuquisaca Department of Bolivia. Its seat is Villa Azurduy.  In 2012 the population was 10,594 persons.  The municipality is very poor; in 2010 93% were below the poverty line, and 75% were in extreme poverty.  In 2001 there were seven automobiles (including trucks) in the municipality.

Geography 
The municipality is in the mountains of the Cordillera Oriental of the Andes, and is bordered on the west by the Pilcomayo River.  The mountain ranges and the rivers are generally oriented north-south. Due to its elevation, the municipality experiences a wide range of temperatures between day and night. The average annual temperature is 14° C, the average monthly values varying between 10° C in June and July to 16° C in December and January. Annual precipitation barely reaches , with less than 10 mm monthly in the dry season of May to August, and with the highest rainfall, 100 to 110 mm per month, between December and February.

To the north Azurduy Municipality is bordered by Tarvita Municipality, also of Azurduy Province, and El Villar Municipality of Tomina Province; to the east by Hernando Siles Province, and to the west and south by Nor Cinti Province. There are 132 settlements in the municipality with thirty-six villages, of which only eight are accessible by road.

Economics
The people are primarily employed in agriculture and livestock raising, although there is some mining.  Major crops include corn, wheat, potatoes, barley and peppers. Sheep, cattle, goats, pigs, horses and poultry are raised.

The people 
The people are predominantly indigenous citizens of Quechuan descent.

Population
The population of the municipality of Azurduy has not increased from 1992 to 2012.
 1992: 10,818 inhabitants (census)
 2001: 11,349 inhabitants (census)
 2012: 10,594 inhabitants (census)
At the 2001 census, the literacy rate was 61.4 percent, the life expectancy of the newborn was 57.0 years, and the infant mortality rate was 9.3 per cent. 60.9 percent of the population spoke Spanish, 55.8 percent spoke Quechua (2001). 90.3 percent of the population had access to electricity, while 89.7 percent lived without sanitation facilities.

Cantons 
The municipality is divided into three cantons.
 Las Casas Canton, with administrative seat in Torrecillas
 Azurduy Canton, with administrative seat in Villa Azurduy
 Antonio Lopez Canton, with administrative seat in San Antonio

References 

Municipalities of Chuquisaca Department